Asbach is a municipality in the district of Neuwied, in Rhineland-Palatinate, Germany. It is situated in the Westerwald, approx. 25 km north of Neuwied, and 25 km south-east of Bonn.

Asbach is the seat of the Verbandsgemeinde ("collective municipality") Asbach.

References

Neuwied (district)